La Notte was an Italian afternoon newspaper published in Milan between 1952 and 1995.

History 
The newspaper was financed by industrialist Carlo Pesenti, who wanted to curb the potential rise of communism in the country and support the majority electoral law, referred by the left-wing parties as a "swindle law". The journalist Setefano “Nino” Nutrizio, the former chief editor of sport news of Il Popolo d'Italia, was appointed editor, a position he held until 1979.

The newspaper got an unexpected success, with a print run of 250,000 copies per day during the 1960s. Particular attention was given to crime news and sports. The paper also introduced several structural and conceptual innovations: it was the first Italian newspaper to publish stock market listings, the first to publish a guide to film shows with timetables, theatre addresses, ticket prices, phone numbers and transports, and the first to review films with a rating system, irritating cinema-owners who even launched a campaign to boycott the newspaper.

In 1984 the newspaper was bought by the publisher Rusconi, and in 1993 it was acquired by Paolo Berlusconi. Following a significant drop in sales, the paper closed in January 1995. An attempt to relaunch it in 1997 only lasted a few weeks.

References

1952 establishments in Italy
1995 disestablishments in Italy
Defunct newspapers published in Italy
Italian-language newspapers
Newspapers published in Milan
Newspapers established in 1952
Publications disestablished in 1995
Daily newspapers published in Italy